Joosep Saat (30 July 1900 Tupenurme – 16 January 1977 Tallinn) was an Estonian communist politician, journalist and academic.

Since 1921 he was a member of Communist Party of Estonia. In 1924 he was one of defendants of Trial of the 149, and the verdict was "forced labour for life". In 1938 he received amnesty.

From 1949 to 1956 he was the executive director of Institute of Party History of the Central Committee of the Communist Party of Estonia. From 1955 to 1959 he was the Chairman of the Supreme Soviet of the Estonian Soviet Socialist Republic.

Since 1951 he was a member of Estonian SSR Academy of Sciences.

Awards
 1969: Meritorious Scientist of the Estonian SSR

References

1900 births
1977 deaths
Communist Party of Estonia politicians
Estonian scientists
Estonian journalists
Estonian prisoners and detainees
People from Muhu Parish
Burials at Metsakalmistu